Hernán Buenahora Gutíerrez (born 18 March 1967) is a Colombian former road racing cyclist, who was nicknamed El Cabrito de Barichara during his career. He turned professional in 1990 and placed 18th in the 1994 Tour de France, 10th in the 1995 Tour, 22nd in the 1997 Tour, and 64th in the 1999 Tour.

Riding in the 2006–07 UCI America Tour events, Buenahora won the overall titles of the Clasico Ciclistico Banfoandes and the Vuelta al Táchira, riding for the Gobernación del Zulia – Alcaldía de Cabimas cycling team. In the prior season, he had been disqualified in the Vuelta al Colombia when, whilst leading the race, he had a non-negative doping control. However, Buenahora still managed to finish second overall.

Major results 

1989
 1st Stage 12 Vuelta a Mexico
 2nd Overall Ronde de l'Isard
1990
 1st Stage 5 Vuelta al Táchira
 5th Overall Clásico RCN
 6th Overall Vuelta a Colombia
1st Stage 7
1991
 8th Overall Vuelta a Murcia
1992
 6th Overall Vuelta a Aragón
 10th Overall Critérium du Dauphiné Libéré
1994
 1st Stage 11 Vuelta a Colombia
1995
 10th Overall Tour de France
1st  Combativity award Stage 11 & Overall
1996
 1st Stage 11 Vuelta a Colombia
1997
 1st Stage 3 Vuelta a Colombia
1998
 1st  Overall Volta a Catalunya
1st Stages 6 & 7
1999
 8th Overall Volta a Catalunya
 9th Overall Giro del Trentino
2000
 6th Overall Giro d'Italia
 6th Overall Grande Prémio Jornal de Notícias
2001
 1st  Overall Vuelta a Colombia
1st Stages 6, 7, 9 & 15 (ITT)
2002
 6th Giro del Friuli
2003
 3rd Overall Vuelta a Asturias
2004
 1st Overall Clásico RCN
1st Prologue & Stage 7 (ITT)
2005
 1st Stage 13 Vuelta a Colombia
2006
 1st Overall Clasico Ciclistico Banfoandes
 1st Stage 13 Vuelta a Colombia
 3rd Overall Vuelta al Táchira
1st Stage 6
2007
 1st Overall Vuelta al Táchira
1st Stages 4 & 12 (ITT)
 2nd Overall Vuelta a Colombia
2008
 2nd Overall Vuelta a Colombia
1st Stages 8 (ITT) & 11

Grand Tour general classification results timeline

References

External links
 

1967 births
Living people
People from Barichara
Colombian male cyclists
Vuelta a Colombia stage winners
Sportspeople from Santander Department